KZRD (93.9 FM) is a radio station broadcasting a Regional Mexican format. Licensed to Dodge City, Kansas, United States, the station serves the SW Kansas area. The station is currently owned by Rocking M Media, LLC.

History
The station was assigned the call letters KDGB on April 22, 1987. On September 19, 1995, the station changed its call sign to KDGB, on January 9, 1998, to KRPH, on June 26, 2001, to the current KZRD. On June 29, 2001, the station was sold to Waitt Radio.On December 5, 2005, the station was sold to NRG Media. In 2007, Rocking M bought NRG's Kansas stations (including KZRD).

In April 2016, KZRD flipped from its long running rock format (as "93.9 The Buzzard") to hot AC, branded as "Buzz 93.9."

On December 2, 2019, KZRD changed their format from hot AC to regional Mexican, branded as "La Mexicana", after the local marketing agreement with KMML (92.9 FM) ended.

Previous logo

References

External links

ZRD
Regional Mexican radio stations in the United States
Radio stations established in 1987